The Villager, formerly the Highland Villager, is a Saint Paul, Minnesota newspaper. It was founded by Barry Prichard and Arnold Hed in 1953 as the Highland Villager, after Saint Paul's Highland Park neighborhood, and is the oldest community newspaper in the Twin Cities. It was the first paper to be distributed in both of the Twin Cities; Minneapolis and Saint Paul.  In 2007 it absorbed a sister paper, Avenues (which had been called Grand Gazette till 2003).

As of 2021, the Villager circulates in the Saint Paul neighborhoods of Highland Park, Macalester-Groveland, Merriam Park, Snelling-Hamline, Lexington-Hamline, Summit-University, Summit Hill, West 7th/Fort Road, and Downtown; the Minneapolis neighborhoods of Hiawatha and Minnehaha; and suburban Mendota, Mendota Heights, and Lilydale.

The newspaper is published twice a month on Tuesday evenings. The Villager reports a readership of 90,000.  In addition to paid subscribers, they distribute free doorstep delivery to 60,000 homes, apartments, and businesses. An additional 10,000 copies are distributed free of charge at local newsstands. The newspaper used to be unavailable online  but now the website features digital copies of current editions as well as an archive which subscribers may peruse.

References

External links 
 
Villager Listing

Newspapers published in Minnesota
Mass media in Minneapolis–Saint Paul